Sandro Vanello (born February 15, 1948, in Tarcento) is a retired Italian professional football player.

References

1948 births
Living people
Italian footballers
Serie A players
Serie B players
Inter Milan players
Hellas Verona F.C. players
Palermo F.C. players
Bologna F.C. 1909 players
A.S. Sambenedettese players
Association football midfielders
Footballers from Friuli Venezia Giulia